Dominik Burkhalter (born 1975 in Zurich) is a Swiss bandleader, composer and drummer.

Life
He started playing the drums in 1982, and began his studies at the Jazz School Lucerne in 1995, where he majored in drums in 1999.

Dominik Burkhalter founded the bands Dom and Asphalt Jungle. He currently lives in Zurich and teaches drums and rhythm at the Jazz Department of the Lucerne College of Music.

Discography (selected)
Burkhalter Suhner Gisler "Bus Trip" 2005 
Asphalt Jungle "Last one shuts the door" 2005 
Manufactur "Rong Dob" 2005 
Chris Wiesendanger Nonett "undersong" 2005 
Dom "Dissolved" 2005 
Adrian Frey Septet "Seven Songs" 2004
Reto Suhner Quartet "Montag" 2003
Asphalt Jungle "Sick of Industry-Driven Music" 2003
Moe "Reflections" 2003
Dom "Twilight" 2002
Reto Suhner Quartet "Born in Herisau" 2001  
Manufactur "#2" 2001 
Adrian Frey Septet "The Sign" 2000

References

External links
Official home page
Asphalt Jungle home page
Dom home page
photos by Mark Wohlrab

1975 births
Living people
Swiss composers
Swiss male composers
Jazz bandleaders
Jazz drummers
Swiss drummers
Male drummers
21st-century drummers
21st-century male musicians
Male jazz musicians